Amatuni Simoni Amatuni, born Amatuni Vardapetyan, was a Soviet Armenian politician who served as First Secretary of the Communist Party of Armenia from 1936 to 1937. Born in Yelisavetpol (Ganja), Elizavetpol uezd, Elizavetpol Governorate, Russian Empire, he became a member of the Bolshevik Party in 1919. From 1926 to 1928 he studied at the Institute of Red Professors, then held various party positions in Yerevan, Tiflis, and Baku. An ally of Lavrentiy Beria, he served as Second Secretary of the Communist Party of Armenia from 1935 to 1936, then became First Secretary in 1936 after the death of his predecessor Aghasi Khanjian. With Armenian NKVD chief Khachik Mughdusi, Amatuni oversaw the initial part of the Great Purge in Armenia, before his own arrest on September 23, 1937. He appeared on Stalin's execution list of July 26, 1938 and was shot the same day.

References

Party leaders of the Soviet Union
First Secretaries of the Armenian Communist Party
Great Purge victims from Armenia
Institute of Red Professors alumni
People from Elizavetpol Governorate
Politicians from Ganja, Azerbaijan
1900 births
1938 deaths
Members of the Communist Party of the Soviet Union executed by the Soviet Union